Ethapur (Yethapur) is a panchayat town in Pethanaickenpalayam Taluk in Salem District in the state of Tamil Nadu, India. Ethapur is also referred to as "Vasishtronum" named by Vashista one of the Saptarishis (seven great Rishis).

Demographics
 India census, Ethapur had a population of 10,054. Males constitute 50% of the population and females 50%. Ethapur has an average literacy rate of 67%, higher than the national average of 59.5%: male literacy is 75%, and female literacy is 59%. In Ethapur, 11% of the population is under 6 years of age.

References

Cities and towns in Salem district